Oyo, Oyo State, is the seat of the line of the rulers of Oyo. Their territory, a constituent rump state, is located in contemporary Nigeria. Since the 1900 political absorption into Southern Nigeria of the kingdom that it once served as a metropolitan center, the traditional monarchy has been either a tool of British indirect rule or a legally recognised  traditional polity within the republic of Nigeria.

In the Yoruba language, the word 'oba' means ruler or king. It is also common for the rulers of the various Yoruba domains to have their own special titles. In Ọ̀yọ empire, the oba is referred to as the Aláàfin, meaning owner of the palace.

See also 
 Oyo Empire
Yoruba states
List of rulers of the Yoruba state of Dassa
List of rulers of the Yoruba state of Icha
List of rulers of the Yoruba state of Ketu
List of rulers of the Yoruba state of Sabe
 Lists of office-holders

External links 
 WorldStatesmen Nigeria- Traditional States

Yoruba state of Oyo
 
Yoruba state of Oyo
Yoruba history